Trefor Pugh is a former football (soccer) player who represented New Zealand at international level.

Pugh made a solitary official international appearance for New Zealand in a 4–1 win over New Caledonia on 2 June 1962, Pugh and Duncan McVey scoring twice each for New Zealand.

References 

Year of birth missing (living people)
Living people
New Zealand association footballers
New Zealand international footballers
Association footballers not categorized by position